The Territorial Prelature of Marawi is a Roman Catholic territorial prelature under the Archdiocese of Ozamiz in the Philippines.

It comprises parishes in the minority Catholic community of Marawi, including at Mindanao State University, and four municipalities in the Lanao Provinces with significant Catholic population: Malabang and Balabagan in Lanao del Sur; and Sultan Naga Dimaporo and Balo-i in Lanao del Norte.

History
The prelature was established on November 20, 1976, carved out of the Territorial Prelature (now Diocese) of Iligan. Fr. Bienvenido S. Tudtod, M.S.P., became the first prelate until his death on June 26, 1987. 

It would remain as sede vacante until December 27, 2001, when Fr. Edwin A. de la Peña, M.S.P., was installed as the second and current prelate.

Marawi attacks

On May 23, 2017, the Daesh-affiliated Maute and Abu Sayyaf groups attacked the city. They also stormed the cathedral, where then-Vicar General Fr. Teresito Soganub and several parishioners were held hostage.

Ordinaries

Prelates

See also
 Marawi
 Catholic Church in the Philippines
List of Catholic dioceses in the Philippines

References

External links
 Territorial Prelature of Marawi – GCatholic.org
 Territorial Prelature of Marawi – Catholic Hierarchy

Marawi
Marawi
Christian organizations established in 1976
Roman Catholic dioceses and prelatures established in the 20th century
Territorial prelatures
1976 establishments in the Philippines
Marawi